The 2014 CECAFA Nile Basin Cup was the inaugural edition of the CECAFA Nile Basin Cup, which is organised by CECAFA. It began on 23 May and concluded on 4 June, with Sudan as the first hosts of the tournament.

Ugandan Super League club Victoria University beat A.F.C. Leopards in the final to clinch their first title and US$ 30,000 in prize money. A.F.C. Leopards took home US$20,000 for finishing second, while Sudanese side Al-Ahly Shendi beat Académie Tchité of Burundi in the third place play-off to take home US$10,000.

Participants
On 12 May 2014, the draw for clubs to participate in the tournament was released. The tournament was originally due to kick off on 22 May, but was pushed back a day.

Group A
 Al-Merrikh
 Victoria University
 Al-Malakia
 Polisi

Group B
 A.F.C. Leopards
 Mbeya City
 Académie Tchité
 Etincelles

Group C
 Al-Ahly Shendi
 Defence
 Dikhil

Group stage
The group stage featured eleven teams, with 4 teams in Group A and B and only three in Group C. Three teams advanced from Group A and B and two from Group C.

If two or more teams are equal on points on completion of the group matches, the following criteria are applied to determine the rankings (in descending order):

 Number of points obtained in games between the teams involved;
 Goal difference in games between the teams involved;
 Goals scored in games between the teams involved;
 Away goals scored in games between the teams involved;
 Goal difference in all games;
 Goals scored in all games;
 Drawing of lots.

Group A

Group B

Group C

Knockout stage
In the knockout stage, teams play against each other once. The losers of the semi-finals faced each other in a third place playoff, where the winner was placed third overall in the entire competition.

References

External links
 Group stage results

CECAFA Nile Basin Cup
CECAFA Nile Basin Cup
2014 in Sudanese sport
International association football competitions hosted by Sudan